The 2000 PBA All-Filipino Cup or known as the 2000 Alaxan PBA All-Filipino Cup for sponsorship reasons, was the first conference of the 2000 PBA season. It started on February 20 and ended on June 11, 2000. The tournament is an All-Filipino format, which doesn't require an import or a pure-foreign player for each team.

Format
The following format will be observed for the duration of the conference:
The teams were divided into 2 groups.

Group A:
Alaska Milkmen
Purefoods TJ Hotdogs
San Miguel Beermen
Sta. Lucia Realtors
Tanduay Rhum Masters

Group B:
Barangay Ginebra Kings
Batang Red Bull Energizers
Mobiline Phone Pals
Pop Cola 800s
Shell Velocity

 Teams in a group will play against each other once and against teams in the other group twice; 14 games per team. 
 The top eight teams after the eliminations will advance to the quarterfinals.
Quarterfinals:
Top four teams will have a twice-to-beat advantage against their opponent.
QF1: #1 vs. #8
QF2: #2 vs. #7
QF3: #3 vs. #6
QF4: #4 vs. #5
Best-of-five semifinals:
SF1: QF1 vs. QF4
SF2: QF2 vs. QF3
Third-place playoff: losers of the semifinals
Best-of-seven finals: winners of the semifinals

Elimination round

Team standings

Eighth seed playoff 
Mobiline had a better quotient on their games among Shell and Barangay Ginebra hence they were awarded with the #7 seed.

Bracket

Quarterfinals

(1) Tanduay vs. (8) Barangay Ginebra

(2) San Miguel vs. (7) Mobiline

(3) Alaska vs. (6) Pop Cola

(4) Purefoods vs. (5) Sta. Lucia

Semifinals

(1) Tanduay vs. (4) Purefoods

On May 22, PBA commissioner Jun Bernardino forfeited Tanduay's Games 2 and 3 victories in favor of Purefoods for the deportation of Sonny Alvarado. Purefoods now leads the series 2–1.

The day after Tanduay swept the series 3–0, the Bureau of Immigration and Deportation (BID) revoked Sonny Alvarado's Filipino citizenship as it uncovered that the player used fraudulent papers; consequently, the BID ordered Alvarado's deportation. This caused PBA commissioner Jun Bernardino to forfeit two of Tanduay's semifinal wins (Games 2 and 3) since Alvarado played in those games (he didn't play in the first game). The league earlier forfeited Batang Red Bull's wins when 18-year-old Kerby Raymundo was found to have deficient academic credentials. With the forfeitures, the series would have resumed on Game 4 with Purefoods leading the series 2–1; however, Tanduay secured a temporary restraining order (TRO) that prevented the league from staging Game 4 of their series. The league suspended the Game 4 on the May 24 playdate, the first time a game has been suspended for a cause other than a typhoon, an earthquake, or a bomb threat.

PBA legal counsel Butch Cleofe warned that Tanduay faced suspension from the league, a hefty fine and even expulsion when it fails to show up on the May 26 playdate. A P500,000 fine faced the franchise plus other penalties the commissioner may impose. Prior to the game, Tanduay was able to secure an extension of the TRO hence Game 4 was suspended for a second time; this has been the first time a PBA game has been suspended via a court order. The league has already lost P600,000 on gate receipts and Viva TV lost about P2 million in TV commercials. The league rejected Tanduay's offer of resetting the series with them leading 1–0, with the games that Alvarado played declared as "no contests"; the league insisted that the Rhum Masters play Game 4 with them trailing 1–2. On May 30, Tanduay relented and agreed to play Game 4 with them trailing 1–2. Bernardino would deal with Tanduay's actions "accordingly with due process". To prevent such events from happening again, the PBA Board has decided that Filipino-Americans would have to secure clearances from the BID and the Department of Justice (DOJ; previously, only a BID clearance was sufficient).

When Game 4 was finally played, the game went into overtime; Purefoods' Boyet Fernandez converted a three-point field goal with 0.2 of a second remaining to seal Purefoods' unlikely Finals qualification against 1990s rival Alaska.

(2) San Miguel vs. (3) Alaska

Third place playoff

Finals

Alaska won the title on Game 5 despite trailing by six points late in the fourth quarter; Rodney Santos and Poch Juinio carried the scoring slack when Bong Hawkins and Johnny Abarrientos had bad starts. Abarrientos was able to make it up by hitting a jump-shot to give the Milkmen the lead 85–82. Noy Castillo converted both free-throws to cut the lead to one. Alaska missed four free-throws, including two intentional misses by James Wallkvist with 0.5 of a second remaining to clinch their first All-Filipino championship since 1998. Alvin Patrimonio had a series-best 22 points but went scoreless at the final quarter that helped Alaska to catch up.

References

External links
 PBA.ph

All-Filipino Cup
2000